Microlia amici is a species of rove beetle first found in Brazil. It is a pollen-feeder. The species differs from M. meticola by possessing abdominal segments that are darker; mesotarsus with 5 segments; a seventh tergum without tubercles in the male; and the eighth tergum of the male being emarginated in the posterior margin.

References

Aleocharinae
Beetles described in 2016
Beetles of South America